Hasanamba temple is a Hindu temple located in Hassan, Karnataka, dedicated to the Goddess Shakti or Amba. The  temple was built in the 12th century and tourists are only allowed to visit the temple once a year during the Hindu festival Deepavali in October. Devotees visit the temple to seek blessings of the Goddess during this week.

History
The temple is believed to have been constructed sometime around the 12th century, although the exact date is unknown. There is an ant-hill representing the presiding deity inside the temple premises and because the temple is open for only one week every year, it is considered special to obtain a darshan during the Deepavali festival.

Architecture 
Archeological experts consider the Hasanamba Temple to be an example of the epitome of temple architecture in Karnataka. The city of Hassan dates to the 11th century and the temples around Hassan signify the various dynasties that have ruled ever since the 11th century. It was originally built by the Hoysala dynasty in their tradition, reflecting their faith in Jainism. The temples in the Hassan district are some of the examples of the Hoysala tradition of temple architecture.

Religious Significance
The temple is unusual in that it is open to the devotees only for a week every year. For the remainder of the year, the Goddess is left with a lit lamp, flowers, water and two bags of rice as an offering until the next year. The nandaa deepa, (a ghee-lit lamp) burns for the entire duration of the temple closure, with the ghee never depleting. The anna naivedya (the rice offering) offered to the devi (goddess) at the time of closing the temple is warm and unspoiled when the doors are opened again, a year later. It is revered as a great temple in Hassan.
Every year tens of thousands of people will visit the temple to receive the goddess' blessings.

Historical mythology story of goddesses
Once when the seven Maatrukes (Brahmi, Maheshwari, Kaumari, Vyshnavi, Varahi, Indrani and Chamundi) came floating to the South of India, they were taken aback by the beauty of Hassan and decided to make it their home forever. Maheshwari, Kaumari, and Vyshnavi took residence in the three anthills inside the temple; Brahmi in Kenchamma's Hosakote, while Indrani, Varahi and Chamundi chose the three wells in Devigere Honda.

The town Hassan was named after the presiding deity at the Hasanamba Temple. She is called Hasanamba as she is perceived to be ever smiling, bestowing all riches on her devotees.

While she is worshipped for being benevolent, she is also harsh to those who choose to harm her devotees. There is a belief that Amma Hasanamba turned a mother in law, who tortured Devi’s devotee the (daughter in law), in to a stone in front of her. It is believed that the stone moves an inch every year and when it reaches the lotus feet of Hasanamba the period of Kali Yuga will end.

Once four robbers attempted to rob jewels of Hasanamba and Devi turned them in to stones. And these four stones can be still seen in Kallappa Gudi.

Facts
There is an unusual image depicting Ravana from the epic Ramayana with nine heads, instead of ten, playing the veena. The reason for this image in the inner sanctum sanctorum is unknown but is very interesting nevertheless.

Just after devotees enter the temple they can see a beautiful view of Siddeshwara Swamy which is unusual as it not depicted in the Linga roopa. It appears as Lord Shiva giving.

References

Hindu temples in Hassan district